Ophisops kutchensis, the Kutch small-scaled snake-eye, is a wall lizard in the family of true lizards (Lacertidae). It is endemic to India.

References 

Ophisops
Reptiles of India
Endemic fauna of India
Reptiles described in 2018
Taxa named by Ishan Agarwal
Taxa named by Akshay Khandekar
Taxa named by Uma Ramakrishnan
Taxa named by Raju Vyas
Taxa named by Varad B. Giri